Fantasy sport came in India in later half of 2010s. Federation of Indian Fantasy Sports (FIFS) is national federation of this sport in India.

India have many fantacy mobile gaming or Fantasy sport apps such as Dream11, My 11 circle,  Mobile Premier League (MPL) etc. This is a type of virtual entertainment and deemed as highly addictive. They advertise themselves as mobile fantacy, skill based game apps. The fantasy gaming industry is worth of millions of dollars in the country. Play Store do not allow these apps on their platform for download, thus people who want to play them download them from their websites. To attract people these apps sponsor sports leagues. and advertise through cricket players, film actors for endorsing. They also advertise by Google ads, YouTube channels and by multiple online streaming platforms. Indian fantacy sport apps claim to be skilled based games and not a Betting apps or platforms. But many state government has challenged their this claim in courts across India.

Various apps advertise that their some users earned lakh, crore rupees on their app. Government of India do not have any regulation, control on these apps. As per Google Play Store, these apps are gambling apps and violets Google's anti-gambling policy that's why they banned Mobile Premier League, Dream 11 etc. from their platform. In September 2022, Google Play allowed some gambling, casino apps on their platform. In October 2021, Karnataka banned fantacy gaming apps, in February 2022, Karanataka highcourt lifted it. In October 2022, Tamil Nadu also banned them, in judgement judge said that, These apps are ruined many families, by indulging people into gambling.  The fantacy Sport apps or fantacy sport can be addictive and lead to financial losses. Telangana, Assam, Odisha, Andhra Pradesh, Sikkim, and Nagaland have a complete ban on these type of online games. As per FIFS their member companies do not allow people below 18 to play in their platforms. FIFS is founded by one of this nations leading fantacy sport app Dream11.  These apps use KYC (Know Your Customer) guidelines as per FIFS. But The Times of India found that it not true, many apps only ask KYC when user withdraw money and gae verification is done by user which can be false.

According to a 2022 report of NITI Aayog, fantasy sport is estimated to attract 10,000 cr rupees foreign direct investment in India in the next few years. As per Deloitte's report in same year, the Indian fantasy sport industry is worth 34,000 cr. and it has 13 cr users.  As per News18.com, Online Fantasy Sport Platforms (OFSP) are likely to benefit small, less popular sports in India. In addition to cricket, these apps allow the creation of teams in other sports which are not as popular as cricket, such as field hockey, association football, and kabaddi. Since performance in fantasy sports requires one to be relatively well-versed in the nuances of the sport in question, the addition of hockey, kabaddi, football, and other sports in OFSPs increases the interest in and consumption of these sports.

See also 

 Video games in India - Overview of video games 
 Sport in India 
 Indian Premier League

References
 

Fantasy sports
Sport in India